Apro, also known as Aproumu, is a language spoken by the Aizi people of Ébrié Lagoon in Ivory Coast. Once assumed to be a Kru language like the other two Aizi languages, subsequent investigation has shown it to be Kwa.

References

Languages of Ivory Coast
Lagoon languages